The Virginia Petroleum and Convenience Marketers Association (VPCMA) is a statewide trade association formed in 1948 providing advocacy, educational and networking services to its membership.

Until 1999, the Association was known as the Virginia Petroleum Jobbers Association. As the traditional jobber (wholesaler) evolved more into direct sales to consumers so did the Association. VPCGA now has over 600 members, who in turn own and operate more than 4000 retail locations across Virginia. Members operate gasoline/convenience locations, grocery stores, travel centers, sell home heating oil, lubricants and supply petroleum products to the motoring public, agriculture and maritime industries and the armed forces.

The Association is governed by a 15-member Board of Directors, and has had just three Presidents since its founding. Its President, Michael O'Connor, CAE, has more than 30 years of association management experience and has led the Association as President and Chief Executive Officer since 2000.  He was selected as Virginia's Oilman of the Year in 2007.

In addition to representing the interests of the membership at the Virginia General Assembly and various regulatory agencies, the Association publishes regular industry updates containing important compliance information on pending issues, conducts compliance training seminars to provide hands on training to employees on technical aspects of the petroleum business.  The association's motto is "Virginia Neighbors Serving Neighbors".  VPCGA works closely with the Energy Marketers Association of America (www.ema.org) and the National Association of Convenience Stores (www.nacsonline.com) on Federal Issues

The Association office is located at 7275 Glen Forest Drive Suite 204 Richmond, Virginia 23226

External links
 Website

Organizations based in Virginia
Petroleum in the United States
Trade associations based in the United States
1948 establishments in Virginia